The Trinidad and Tobago Postal Workers Union is a trade union in Trinidad and Tobago which is the recognised union for postal workers employed by TTPost.

See also

 List of trade unions

Trade unions in Trinidad and Tobago
Postal trade unions